Boonyachinda Stadium is a multi-purpose stadium in  the Royal Thai Police Sport Club, Lak Si District, Bangkok, Thailand. It is currently used mostly for football matches and is the home stadium of Police Tero. The stadium holds 3,550 people.

References

Football venues in Thailand
Multi-purpose stadiums in Thailand
Sports venues in Bangkok